The Hard Days Night Hotel is a four star hotel located on North John Street in Liverpool, England. One of the only Beatles themed hotel in the world, it is named after their film, album and song A Hard Day's Night.

The hotel opened four years after initial conception, in February 2008 during Liverpool's reign as European Capital of Culture. It has some 110 rooms, including the famed McCartney and Lennon suites as well as numerous bars and restaurants (Blakes Restaurant, Bar Four, The Lounge & Bar and the Live Lounge). The hotel is situated within the redeveloped Grade II listed Central Buildings, which was designed by Thomas C Clarke and completed in 1884.

References

Hard Days Night Hotel
Hard Days Night Hotel
Hard Days Night Hotel
Hard Days Night Hotel
British companies established in 2004
Grade II listed commercial buildings
Grade II listed hotels